God Knows I Tried is an album by the American blues musician Junior Kimbrough, released in 1998. It was his first posthumous album. Buddy Guy covered "I Gotta Try You Girl" on his Sweet Tea album.

Production
The album includes tracks that were left off Kimbrough's three Fat Possum albums, and were recorded between 1992 and 1997. A few songs were recorded at Kimbrough's juke joint in Chulahoma, Mississippi. Kimbrough first recorded "Tramp" in 1968, as a single for Philwood Records.

Critical reception

The Plain Dealer wrote that "the music here is powerful and, on 'Tramp' and the slashing instrumental 'All Night Long', moving ... The urgency with which Kimbrough plays is undeniable, but how much thought he gave to the shape of these tunes is a question that likely will go unanswered." Miami New Times called Kimbrough "an undisputed master," writing that he "sounded primitive and modern all at the same time."

AllMusic wrote: "Kimbrough single-handedly invented his own blues style, a mixture of hard-edged instrumentation, conversational, ghost-touched vocals, and, unique to the North Mississippi hill country, the looping, hypnotic guitar riffs which he plays through mild, fluid distortion, giving the whole a pulsing, dream-like quality." The Chicago Sun-Times deemed the album one of 1998's 10 best blues releases.

Track listing

References

Junior Kimbrough albums
1998 albums
Fat Possum Records albums